Ziaur Rahman, (Jiẏā'ura Rahamāna; 27 June 1975), known as Zia, is a Bangladeshi rock musician, composer, bassist, songwriter, and architect popularly known as the founder and leader of the Bangladeshi independent music group Shironamhin. In addition, he plays bass guitar, cello, sarod and many other instruments for the compositions and do the production for Shironamhin band.

Musical career
Zia has been a fan of music from his early childhood. He became a hardcore fan of metal music during his college life and used to collect VCPs of the music videos of popular bands.

In 1996, Zia and friends formed the band Shironamhin. They used to sing at TSC, Dhaka University, in their BUET campus and wherever they got a chance. With their band, Zia went to the 2nd Benson & Hedges Star Search competition, and they released their first album Jahajee in 2004. They released a second album, Ichchhe Ghuri, in 2006, and their third, fourth and fifth albums were released in 2009, 2010 and 2013 respectively.

In 2014, Zia with his band Shironamhin attended the Sri Lanka's most famous musical festival titled Galle Music Festival.

Instruments
Zia is skilled in playing Warwick infinity NT, Ibanez SR5000E Prestige, Hartke bass attack, Morley Pedals. Additionally, he plays bass guitar, cello, sarod and many other instruments for the compositions and does the production for Shironamhin band. For their self-titled album Shironamhin Shironamhin, he learnt playing violin, cello and contrabass.

Works

Band albums
 Jahajee (2004), (Bengali: জাহাজী)
 Ichchhe Ghuri (2006), (Bengali: ইচ্ছেঘুড়ি)
 Bondho Janala (2009), (Bengali: বন্ধ জানালা)
 Shironamhin Rabindranath (2010), (Bengali: শিরোনামহীন রবীন্দ্রনাথ)
 Shironamhin Shironamhin (2013), (Bengali: শিরোনামহীন শিরোনামহীন)

Mixed album songs
 Neon Aloy Shagotom (2007)
 Shopnochura 2 (2006)
 Shopnochura 3 (2007)
 Bondhuta (2008)
 Rock 101 (2008)
 WFP Campaign (2009)

Literary work
Zia released a new poetry book titled 'Nirbachito Gaankobita' (Selected song) in 2019 Ekushey Book Fair.

References

External links 

 
 
 Shironamhin on YouTube
 Shironamhin on iTunes
 Shironamhin on Amazan

Living people
Shironamhin
Bangladeshi male musicians
1975 births
Bangladesh University of Engineering and Technology alumni
Notre Dame College, Dhaka alumni
St. Gregory's High School and College alumni